Deon Terrell Miles is an American Chemist who is Professor and Chair of Chemistry at the Sewanee: The University of the South. His research considers the development of functionalised nanoparticles and chemistry education.

Early life and education 
Miles was born in Gary, Indiana. He studied chemistry at Wabash College and graduated in 1997. He won several awards for chemistry and was manager of the basketball team. He delivered the commencement address. He was a doctoral student at the University of North Carolina at Chapel Hill, where he worked with Royce W. Murray and studied functionalised nanoparticles.

Research and career 
In 2002 Miles joined Sewanee: The University of the South, where he focusses on the development of nanoparticles and novel strategies for teaching chemistry. At Sewanee, Miles delivered a course on the science of food and chemistry of cooking.

Throughout the COVID-19 pandemic, Miles developed homemade kits that could be used to teach students about spectroscopy and chromatography from home.

Select publications

Personal life 
Miles is married with two children. He is an ordained deacon at the Silverdale Baptist Church.

References 

Living people
Year of birth missing (living people)
Wabash College alumni
African-American chemists
University of North Carolina alumni
People from Gary, Indiana
21st-century African-American people